Herbert Reich may refer to:

 Herbert Reich (engineer) (1900–2000), American electrical engineer
 Herbert Reich (sailor) (born 1938), German former sailor